Lays From Afar is the third studio album by the German melodic death metal band Suidakra.

Track listing 
 A Darksome Path - 04:35
 Chants of Lethe - 04:31
 The Well of Might - 04:03
 The Hidden Quest - 03:52
 Morrigan - 03:49
 Peregrin - 01:24
 Wasted Lands - 04:35
 Strayed in Nowhere - 04:19
 Airne - 01:08
 Lays from Afar - 04:35
 Foggy Dew - 01:18

Personnel 
 Arkadius Antonik – lead, rhythm, melodic, acoustic guitars & main vocals
 Marcel Schoenen – melodic, acoustic guitars & clean vocals
 Nils Bross - bass
 Stefan Möller – drums
 Daniela Voigt - Keyboards and vocals
 Andy Classen – engineering & mastering
 Kris Verwimp - covert art

External links 
 Track list and lyrics on suidakra.com

1999 albums
Suidakra albums